The following is the list of squads for each of the 15 teams that competed in the men's basketball tournament at the 1956 Summer Olympics.

Group A

Japan

The following players represented Japan:

 Hiroshi Saito
 Hitoshi Konno
 Kenichi Imaizumi
 Manabu Fujita
 Reizo Ohira
 Riichi Arai
 Setsuo Nara
 Shutaro Shoji
 Takeo Sugiyama
 Takashi Itoyama
 Tetsuro Noborisaka

Philippines

The following players represented the Philippines:

 Tony Genato
 Antonio Villamor
 Carlos Badion
 Carlos Loyzaga
 Eddie Lim
 Leonardo Marquicias
 Loreto Carbonell
 Mariano Tolentino
 Martin Urra
 Rafael Barretto
 Ramón Manulat
 Ramón Campos

Thailand

The following players represented Thailand:

 Ampol Saranont
 Chalaw Sonthong
 Chan Sae-Lim
 Kirin Chavanwong
 Kuang Sae-Lim
 Mongkol Aimmanolrom
 Surakit Rukpanich
 Ta Sriratana
 Visit Chaicharoen

United States

The following players represented the United States:

 Carl Cain
 Bill Hougland
 K. C. Jones
 Bill Russell
 Jim Walsh
 Billy Evans
 Burdie Haldorson
 Ron Tomsic
 Dick Boushka
 Gib Ford
 Bob Jeangerard
 Chuck Darling

Group B

Canada

The following players represented Canada:

 Bob Pickel
 Coulter Osborne
 Don Macintosh
 Doug Brinham
 Ed Lucht
 George Stulac
 John McLeod
 Ed Wild
 Mel Brown
 Bob Burtwell
 Ron Stuart
 Ron Bissett

France

The following players represented France:

 André Schlupp
 Christian Baltzer
 Gérard Sturla
 Henri Grange
 Henri Rey
 Robert Monclar
 Jean-Paul Beugnot
 Maurice Buffière
 Roger Antoine
 Roger Haudegand
 Roger Veyron
 Yves Gominon

Singapore

The following players represented Singapore:

 Chen Sho Fa
 Ho Lien Siew
 Jerome Henderson
 Ko Tai Chuen
 Lee Chak Men
 Ong Kiat Guan
 Wee Tian Siak
 Wong Kim Poh
 Yee Tit Kwan
 Yeo Gek Huat

Soviet Union

The following players represented the Soviet Union:

 Valdis Muižnieks
 Maigonis Valdmanis
 Vladimir Torban
 Stasys Stonkus
 Kazys Petkevičius
 Arkady Bochkaryov
 Jānis Krūmiņš
 Mikhail Semyonov
 Algirdas Lauritėnas
 Yury Ozerov
 Viktor Zubkov
 Mikhail Studenetsky

Group C

Bulgaria

The following players represented Bulgaria:

 Atanas Atanasov
 Georgi Kanev
 Georgi Panov
 Iliya Mirchev
 Konstantin Totev
 Lyubomir Panov
 Nikolay Ilov
 Tsvetko Slavov
 Vasil Manchenko
 Viktor Radev
 Vladimir Savov

Formosa

The following players represented Taiwan:

 Chen Tsu-Li
 Chien Kok-Ching
 Hoo Cha-pen
 James Yap
 Lai Lam-kwong
 Ling Jing-huan
 Loo Hor-Kuay
 Tong Suet-fong
 Wang Yih-jiun
 Willie Chu
 Wu Yet-An
 Yung Pi-hock

South Korea

The following players represented South Korea:

 An Yeong-sik
 An Byeong-seok
 Jo Byeong-hyeon
 Choi Tae-gon
 Kim Chun-bae
 Kim Hyeong-il
 Kim Yeong-gi
 Kim Yeong-su
 Go Se-tae
 Baek Jeong-nam

Uruguay

The following players represented Uruguay:

 Carlos Blixen
 Ramiro Cortés
 Héctor Costa
 Nelson Chelle
 Nelson Demarco
 Héctor García
 Carlos González
 Sergio Matto
 Oscar Moglia
 Raúl Mera
 Ariel Olascoaga
 Milton Scaron

Group D

Australia

The following players represented Australia:

 Algis Ignatavicius
 Bruce Flick
 Colin Burdett
 Geoff Heskett
 Inga Freidenfelds
 George Dancis
 Ken Finch
 Merv Moy
 Peter Bumbers
 Peter Demos
 Peter Sutton
 Stan Dargis

Brazil

The following players represented Brazil:

 Amaury
 Angelim
 Edson Bispo
 Fausto
 Jamil Gedeão
 Jorge Olivieri
 Zé Luiz
 Mayr Facci
 Nelson Lisboa
 Wilson Bombarda
 Wlamir Marques
 Algodão

Chile

The following players represented Chile:

 Hernán Raffo
 Juan Ostoic
 Luis Salvadores
 Maximiliano Garafulic
 Orlando Etcheverre
 Orlando Silva
 Pedro Araya
 Raúl Urra
 Rolando Etchepare
 Rufino Bernedo
 Victor Mahaña

References

1956 Summer Olympics